Andy McAvoy (born 28 August 1979) is an English footballer who played in The Football League for Blackburn Rovers, Hartlepool United, Macclesfield Town and Limerick F.C.

References

English footballers
Blackburn Rovers F.C. players
Hartlepool United F.C. players
Macclesfield Town F.C. players
English Football League players
1979 births
Living people
Association football midfielders